Michel Langerak (born 8 July 1968) is a Dutch professional football manager  and former player who is currently the assistant coach at Kozakken Boys.

Playing career 
Langerak played professionally from 1987 to 2003. He started his career with DS '79, which had changed its name from 1990–91 to Dordrecht '90. He made his debut as a professional football player on 13 December 1987 in a 1–2 loss to Sparta, when he came on as a substitute for Kees Koudstaal at halftime.

In 1991, Langerak was sent on a six-month loan deal VVV. He returned to Dordrecht, which had merged with SVV to form SVV/Dordrecht '90, which from 12 September 1992 was again called Dordrecht '90. In 1996, Langerak moved to NEC where he would play for a year and a half. After this, he played for AZ (1997–99) and ended his professional career at Sparta Rotterdam (1999–02).

Langerak played as an attacking midfielder. He made a total of 420 appearances in professional football and scored 103 goals. After retiring from professional football, he began playing in the amateur Hoofdklasse, first with Deltasport and since FC Lienden.

Managerial career
Lanegerak started coaching for the youth teams of Sparta Rotterdam (2003–2005) and TOP Oss (2005–2006). Next he became the head coach of De Zwerver (2006–07), LRC Leerdam (2007–10), Kozakken Boys (2010–13), ASWH (2013–15), VV Sliedrecht (2016–18), and once more of Kozakken Boys (2018–19). Alongside, he works at the Oudehoven Lyceum in Gorinchem.

References

1968 births
Living people
Dutch footballers
Dutch football managers
Kozakken Boys managers
ASWH managers
Footballers from Dordrecht
Eredivisie players
Eerste Divisie players
FC Lienden players
FC Dordrecht players
VVV-Venlo players
NEC Nijmegen players
AZ Alkmaar players
Sparta Rotterdam players
Association football midfielders